Desert Hills is an unincorporated community and census-designated place (CDP) in Mohave County, Arizona, United States. The population was 2,764 at the 2020 census, up from 2,245 at the 2010 census.

Geography
Desert Hills is located in western Mohave County at  (34.547363, -114.366781). It is sits on the east side of the Colorado River, impounded as Lake Havasu. The CDP is bordered to the south and east by Lake Havasu City, to the north by Crystal Beach, and to the west, across the Colorado, by San Bernardino County, California. Arizona State Route 95 runs along the eastern edge of the CDP, leading south  to the center of Lake Havasu City and north  to Interstate 40.

Demographics

As of the census of 2000, there were 2,183 people, 997 households, and 677 families living in the CDP. The racial makeup of the CDP was 93.1% White, 0.1% Black or African American, 0.6% Native American, 0.4% Asian, 4.4% from other races, and 1.4% from two or more races.  9.3% of the population were Hispanic or Latino of any race.

There were 997 households, out of which 17.8% had children under the age of 18 living with them, 55.7% were married couples living together, 7.5% had a female householder with no husband present, and 32.0% were non-families. 25.2% of all households were made up of individuals, and 12.8% had someone living alone who was 65 years of age or older.  The average household size was 2.19 and the average family size was 2.54.

In the CDP, the population was spread out, with 16.6% under the age of 18, 5.0% from 18 to 24, 19.9% from 25 to 44, 31.1% from 45 to 64, and 27.4% who were 65 years of age or older.  The median age was 52 years. For every 100 females, there were 99.7 males.  For every 100 females age 18 and over, there were 99.5 males.

The median income for a household in the CDP was $26,678, and the median income for a family was $32,685. Males had a median income of $21,690 versus $20,433 for females. The per capita income for the CDP was $14,322.  About 10.5% of families and 14.1% of the population were below the poverty line, including 14.4% of those under age 18 and 11.0% of those age 65 or over.

Education
It is in the Lake Havasu Unified School District, which operates Lake Havasu High School.

References

Census-designated places in Mohave County, Arizona